On-Line Software International, Inc., was a Fort Lee, New Jersey, company whose earnings reports were followed by The New York Times in the 1980s and 1990s. It was founded in 1969.

In late 1986 the company acquired Mathematica's RAMIS (software) product, which had sold it to Martin Marietta Corporation in 1983; Computer Associates subsequently acquired On-Line Software. RAMIS was passed along together with a front-end called English.

Shareholders
A claim by former On-Line shareholder against Computer Associates resulted in a 2002 award of $5.7 million "because of violations committed during its 1991 acquisition of On-Line Software International Inc." CA was also ordered to pay "interest of $4.6 million" for the decade plus since 1991.

References

American companies established in 1969
American companies disestablished in 1991
Computer companies established in 1969
Computer companies disestablished in 1991
Defunct software companies of the United States
Software companies based in New Jersey